Wishart Township is an inactive township in Polk County, in the U.S. state of Missouri.

Wishart Township takes its name from the community of Wishart, Missouri.

References

Townships in Missouri
Townships in Polk County, Missouri